Phoracantha is a genus of eucalyptus borers in the family Cerambycidae. There are at least two described species in Phoracantha.

Species
 Phoracantha obscura (Donovan, 1805)
 Phoracantha punctata (Donovan, 1805)
 Phoracantha recurva Newman, 1840
 Phoracantha semipunctata (Fabricius, 1775) (eucalyptus longhorn borer)

References

Further reading

 
 
 
 

Phoracanthini